Beatriz Cortez is a Los Angeles-based artist and scholar from El Salvador. In 2017, Cortez was featured in a science fiction-themed exhibit at University of California, Riverside, and in 2018, her work was shown in the Made in L.A. group artist exhibition at the Hammer Museum in Los Angeles. She holds a Ph.D in Latin American Literature from Arizona State University. She also earned an M.F.A. from the California Institute of the Arts. Cortez currently teaches in the Central American Studies department at California State University, Northridge. According to Cortez, her work explores "simultaneity, life in different temporalities and different versions of modernity, particularly in relation to memory and loss in the aftermath of war and the experience of migration". Cortez has received the 2018 Rema Hort Mann Foundation Fellowship for Emerging Artists, the 2017 Artist Community Engagement Grant, and the 2016 California Community Foundation Fellowship for Visual Artists. Beatriz Cortez is represented by Commonwealth and Council, Los Angeles.

Selected works of art

Tzolk'in 
One of Cortez's most popular works is a sculpture called Tzolk'in. Cortez created two identical sculptures in two separate locations. One was located at the Hammer Museum, part of the Made in L.A. 2018 installation. The other sculpture was by the Los Angeles river as a site specific, independent public art sculpture. The reason for the drastically different locations was to highlight the different realities that exist within the same cities. Both of the sculptures were facing each other, even though they were twenty miles apart, the reason for this is to reference the bond that the two sculptures have to each other which is comparable to the "bond that binds two entities of the same kind across space and time."

There are technically three different sculptures of Tzolk'in in the world. Cortez recreated a virtual sculpture in order to honor the death of Claudia Gomez Gonzales, who was murdered by an American Customs and Border Protection agent, near the Rio Grande River. Cortez was able to create the virtual Tzolk'in by partnering with Nancy Baker Cahill's app 4th Wall. If the users of the app go to the site on the Rio Grande River and hold their phone up, they will be able to see the virtual sculpture.

Memory Insertion Capsule 
Beatriz Cortez's Memory Insertion Capsule, made in 2017, explores several concepts ranging from ancient migration to the history of forced sterilization by L.A. eugenists in the early 20th century. Cortez draws her inspiration for many of her sculptures from literature, archives, philosophies, ancient art and indigenous cultures. Memory Insertion Capsule references both local construction techniques along with Indigenous architecture all while taking the form of a spacecraft/capsule. Cortez incorporates steel and futuristic concepts with Indigenous architecture to connect back to her philosophy of understanding “migration as a planetary motion that has existed for millions of years”. Within the capsule sits a steel helmet that projects images referencing Paul Popenoe who supported the theory of eugenics. The tent above the capsule refers to homelessness and forced migration that is happening to this day both in and outside of Los Angeles. The capsule itself is 12-sided with visible bumps on each of the steel panels mimicking the repujado metalwork of earlier Spanish colonists. All of the welding is done by Cortez herself, thus referencing gender constructs and how “men make things with steel, while women stitch. … When I’m welding, I imagine myself a seamstress”. Numerous symbols and concepts are presented by this work however, Cortez primarily hopes to change the concept of how we view Indigenous cultures as being a part of the past and instead “imagine indigenous people as part of our future”.

Selected exhibitions 
Cortez has had solo exhibitions at Craft Contemporary, Los Angeles (2019); Clockshop, Los Angeles (2018); Vincent Price Art Museum, Los Angeles (2016); Monte Vista Projects, Los Angeles (2016); Centro Cultural de España de El Salvador (2014); and Museo Municipal Tecleño (MUTE), El Salvador (2012). Selected group exhibitions have included her work at Tina Kim Gallery, New York (2018); Hammer Museum, Los Angeles (2018); BANK/MABSOCIETY, Shanghai, China (2017); Ballroom Marfa, Marfa, Texas (2017); Whitney Museum of American Art, New York (2017); Centro Cultural Metropolitano, Quito, Ecuador (2016); and Los Angeles Contemporary Exhibitions (2016). Cortez has received an Emergency Grant from the Foundation of Contemporary Arts (2019), the Rema Hort Mann Foundation Emerging Artist Grant (2018), the Artist Community Engagement Grant (2017), and the California Community Foundation Fellowship for Visual Artists (2016).

Trinidad / Joy Station (2019) 
Trinidad / Joy Station was on view in from January 27 – May 12, 2019 at Craft Contemporary in Los Angeles. In this exhibition Cortez imagined a future communal life that combines upon geodesic dome architecture or post-war utopian communities in the United States with the collective living practices of the ancient Maya in what is present-day El Salvador. The installation speaks to notions of speculative thought, nomadism, and Spinozian Joy.

Collections 
Cortez's work is featured in the following collections: The Broad Museum at MSU (East Lansing, MI), El Paso Museum of Art (El Paso, Texas), Ford Foundation (New York, NY), Mario Cader-Fench Collection (Miami, Florida), and Museo Comunitario Kaqjay (Patzicía, Guatemala).

Awards and fellowships 
Awards, grants, and fellowships Cortez has received include: Artadia Los Angeles Award (2020), Inaugural Frieze LIFEWTR Sculpture Prize (2019), Emergency Grant. Foundation for Contemporary Arts (2019), Rema Hort Mann Foundation Grant for Emerging Artists (2018), The Main Museum Artist-in-Residence, Los Angeles (2018), Artist Community Engagement Grant in Los Angeles (2017), California Community Foundation Fellowship for Visual Artists (2016–2017), The Reef, Artist-in-Residence (2015–2016), Cerritos College Art + TECH Artist-in-Residence (2015), Guatemala después:  Investigación artística, intercambio y enlace público en lugares de memoria y transformación. (Guatemala afterwards: Artistic research, exchange, and public engagement in sites of memory and transformation). “Vida y memoria” (“Life and Memory”), proyecto colectivo con Kaqjay Moloj (collaborative project with the Kaqjay Moloj collective). Site specific: Patzicía, Guatemala. Ciudad imaginación & the New School in New York City (2014-2015), and Walt Disney Company Foundation Scholarship, California Institute of the Arts (2013-2015).

Notes 

American artists
Living people
Year of birth missing (living people)
Salvadoran emigrants to the United States